Lieutenant-General John Elwood "Jack" Vance,  (July 28, 1933 – September 10, 2013) was a Canadian Forces officer who became Vice Chief of the Defence Staff in Canada.

Career
Vance joined the Canadian Army in 1952 and graduated from the Royal Military College of Canada in 1956. He became Commanding Officer of 3 Mechanized Commando at CFB Baden-Soellingen in 1971, Deputy Chief of Staff Training in 1972, and Director Individual Training at National Defence Headquarters in 1973. He went on to be Director-General Recruiting, Education and Training in 1975, Commander of 4 Canadian Mechanized Brigade Group in 1976, and Chief of Staff Operations in 1978. After that he became Chief of Postings, Careers and Senior Appointments in 1980, Chief of Personnel in 1983, and Vice Chief of the Defence Staff in 1985 before retiring in 1988. He died in September 2013.

References

1933 births
2013 deaths
Commanders of the Order of Military Merit (Canada)
Vice Chiefs of the Defence Staff (Canada)
Canadian generals
Canadian military personnel from Ontario
Royal Military College of Canada alumni